Bovi Ugboma is a Nigerian stand-up comedian, actor, and writer. He has organized popular stand-up comedy concerts like Bovi: Man on Fire across the globe. He is married to his wife, Kris Asimonye Ugboma and 42 years of age.

Early life and education 
Bovi Ugboma was born in Benin City, the capital of Edo State. He attended UNIBEN staff school for his primary education.  In 1991, he was enrolled in Government College, Ughelli in Delta State. For disciplinary reasons and fear from his parents of his development as a youth, he was removed from boarding school and transferred to Edokpolor grammar school in Benin city where they lived. That move proved non-productive and he moved to his third secondary school, Boys model secondary school, Onicha Olona, an all boarding school. After completing his secondary education, he gained admission in 1998 to Delta State University where he studied Theatre Arts.

Comedy career 
2007

Bovi began his career in April 2007, starring in the sitcom Extended Family, which he also wrote and produced.
 The show was popular and fans loved it.

2008 - 2011

Bovi was an emerging force in comedy shows and events throughout Nigeria. he made his stand-up comedy debut in Nigeria's premiere comedy franchise, Night of a thousand laughs organized by Opa Williams. By 2011, he was headlining the show across the country.

2013 - 2014

His first stand-up special held at the Eko convention center. He would go on to stage the sequel in 2014. Bovi: Man on Fire 2014 also featured international superstars Ja Rule and Ashanti. Bovi took the one-man special to several cities in the United States, London, Melbourne, Kiev, Brisbane, Sydney, Moscow and Toronto.

2017

He went on a break for three years after the 2014 edition of the show, after the hiatus, the Man on Fire franchise returned to Lagos and it was the most successful yet. The fourth edition in Lagos held in April 2019 and Bovi said it is the last of the man on Fire franchise. He says his next special will go by another title. Bovi began a series titled "BACK TO SCHOOL" in 2018 which he uploads in his YouTube channel. Bovi has worked alongside other Nigerian comedians such as I Go Dye, I Go Save, Basketmouth, Buchi, Odogwu, Okey Bakassi, Julius Agwu and many others.

2022

In July 2022, Bovi held his latest comedy special, Bovi- Naughty By Nature in Lagos and it was sold out two days before the show.

Movies

2015–2018 

Bovi premiered his first movie It's Her Day on 9 September 2016. The movie grossed 55 million Naira in the Nigerian box office.  In 2016, he starred in the romantic comedy, 4-1-Love as the lead actor.

In 2017, he was nominated for the AMVCA awards as the best actor in comedy; his third individual nomination since the inception of the AMVCA and the fourth from his works. The movie, though lacking in mainstream publicity, went on to have a decent run in the cinemas and grossed 55 million naira at the box office.

2020 

In 2020 he starred as a police officer in the remake of the Nollywood classic Nneka the Pretty Serpent.

2021 

He also wrote, co-produced and starred in his second film, My Village People. The film went on went on to join the list of 17 Nigerian films to gross100 million naira in the local box office.

Personal life
Bovi is happily married to his heartthrob,  Kris Asimonye Ugboma with three children.

Early January 2022, his wife underwent surgery after an episode of ectopic pregnancy which ruptured one of her fallopian tubes.

The two celebrated their 13th Anniversary on September 19,2022 with Bovi praising his wife for taming him and carrying his children for 27 months altogether.

Awards and nominations

Filmography

See also 
 List of Nigerian comedians

References

External links 
Twitter page

1979 births
21st-century Nigerian male actors
Living people
Male actors from Delta State
Nigerian male comedians
Nigerian film directors
Nigerian film producers
Nigerian screenwriters
Delta State University, Abraka alumni
Nigerian male television actors
Nigerian male film actors
Nigerian stand-up comedians